Al-Jawf Province ( Minṭaqat al-Jawf pronounced [alˈdʒoːf]), also spelled Al-Jouf, is one of the provinces of Saudi Arabia, located in the north of the country, containing its only international border with Jordan to the west. It is one of the earliest inhabited regions of Arabian Peninsula, with evidence of human habitation dating back to the Stone Age and the Acheulean tool culture. Human settlement continued unbroken throughout the Copper Age, a period that saw the kingdom of Qidar fight against the Assyrian state for its independence. It is also in this period that references to Arabs first appear in historical texts. A Christian kingdom later emerged under the rule of the Bani Kalb tribe and survived until the arrival of Islam and the Islamic conquest of Al-Jawf. Following the region's Islamization it fell under the control of the Tayy tribe. Al-Jawf was incorporated into the third Saudi state at the time of its formation in 1932. In the 20th century the region was a site of conflict between the Al-Rashid family and the Al-Shaalan family, though it eventually came under the rule of King Abdulaziz bin Abdul Rahman Al Saud.

The Al-Jawf region is one of the most fertile regions in the Saudi Arabia. The area around the town of Tabarjal is known as a national breadbasket due to the variety of crops grown there. Unlike most of the country, parts of Al-Jawf boast a moderate climate, fertile soil, and abundant groundwater, allowing for the unusually high levels of agricultural activity seen in the region. The province is famous for cultivating olive trees and is responsible for approximately 67% of the olive oil made in the Kingdom. Al-Jawf is also home to the widespread cultivation of palm trees and produces approximately 150,000 tons of dates every year.

Etymology 
The word "Al-Jawf " refers to land that has widened and collapsed into a broad cavity. The name is not unique in the Arabian Peninsula and is also used for Yemen's Al Jawf Governorate. The word has been used to refer to locations in Yamamah and Diyar Saad. Other regions bearing the name Al-Jawf include the Jawf of Muammar in the Asir Region and Jawf Bani Hajir in Eastern Province.

The Al-Jawf region was formerly known as Jawf al-Amr and was inhabited by the Tayy tribe. It is also known as Jawf Al-Sirhan, which refers to a valley in the province that extends from the northwestern tip of the An Nafud desert to eastern Jordan. The word al-Jawf is used locally to refer to the city of Dumat al-Jandal.

History

Pre-Islamic History

Prehistoric 
Archaeological remains indicate that Al-Jawf has been inhabited since prehistoric times. A 1966 expedition to the Columns of Rajajil found numerous stone tools and pottery fractures that were used to date the site to the fourth millennium BC. 

The Saudi Department of Antiquities and Museums discovered a site in 1977 near the center of Shuhitia dating to the Stone Age. In 1985, an archaeological team studying the ruins uncovered an additional 16 sites in the vicinity, with most of the locations dating to the Assyrian Early Period.

Assyrian Period 
Al-Jawf has long held regional importance because of its strategic location on the Incense Road. The Assyrians considered the Kingdom of Qedar, whose capital of Dumat al-Jandal is located in Al-Jawf, to be a threat due to its hostility to Assyrian control. It was in this period that the first reference to the Arabs appears in the historical record on a monument built in 853 BC to memorialize of the Battle of Qarqar. The Qedarite Queen Zabibe is listed among the monarchs who had paid tribute to Assyrian King Tiglath-Pileser III. 

Queen Samsi of Qedar later rebelled against Tiglath-Pileser III in alliance with the King of Damascus. Assyria suppressed the rebellion, killing 9,400 Qedarite warriors and capturing thousands of prisoners of war. Queen Samsi, realizing that the cause was lost, surrendered and declared obedience to the Assyrian monarchy. Tiglath-Pileser III restored her to the throne and appointed an emmissary with an army of 10,000 men to monitor her.

Hostilities continued under the reign of Queen Yatie, who supported of the Chaldeans under Marduk-apla-iddina II in their successful defense of Babylon against an Assyrian army commanded by King Sennacherib. Queen Yatie also sent her brother to participate in the battle for the city of Kish in 703 BC. 

Queen Yatie's successor, Queen Te'el-hunu, was defeated by Sennacherib's forces and retreated to Dumat al-Jandal in 688 BC. Sennacherib captured her there along with the Princess Tabua and transported them to Nineveh. 

During the reign of the Assyrian King Esarhaddon the Qedarite King Hazael travelled to the Assyrian capital of Nineveh bearing gifts in an attempt to reacquire sacred relics taken by the Assyrians from Dumat al-Jandal. Esarhaddon accepted and appointed the Princess Tabua as Hazael's co-regent. Yatia succeeded Hazael as King of Qedarites and was quickly met with a rebellion demanding independence from the Assyrians. The rebellion was ultimately suppressed by Assyrian forces.

King Yatia in turn rebelled against Esarhaddon while the latter was campaigning in Egypt against the Pharaoh Taharqa. Esarhaddon's army defeated Yatia and once again seized sacred relics from the Qederites, though Yatia himself survived. Esarhaddon was succeeded by his son Ashurbanipal in 668 BC, and following Ashurbanipal's ascension to the throne King Yatia travelled to Ninevah to request the return of the sacred relics and swear loyalty to the Assyrian state. Following the return of the relics, however, Yatia refused to pay tribute to Assyria and launched a revolt against Assyrian suzerainty. Ashurbanipal sent an army that crushed the uprising and forced Yatia into exile. Resistance to Assyrian power continued under Yatia's successors King Amoladi and Queen Attia, who had also previously been married to Yatia. The new king launched a failed attack on the Assyrian state and was captured by King Kamish of Moab. Amoladi and Attia were taken to Nineveh where they were punished by Ashurbanipal.

Ashurbanipal then appointed Abb Yatia Bin Tari King of the Qedarites, but the move backfired as Abb Yatia backed Ashurbanipal's older brother Shamash-shum-ukin when he launched a rebellion to usurp the throne in 652 BC. Abb Yatia failed to enter Babylon with his army and was routed by forces loyal to Ashurbanipal. After once again pleading fealty to the Assyrian crown he was allowed to remain King of Qedar. Abb Yatia rebelled once again with the support of the former Qedari King Yatia bin Hazael. This time, however, Ashurbanipal launched a major campaign against the Kingdom of Qedar, definitively ending the Qedarite resistance.

Post-Assyrian 
The Assyrian Empire ceased to function shortly after the sack of Ninevah in 612 BC. It was replaced as the regional power in Al-Jawf by the Neo-Babylonian Empire, which at least initially led to a period of relative peace. This period of peace lasted until Nabonidus rose to power in 556 BC and sought to occupy several areas to the south of Al-Jawf including Tayma, Lihyan, Khaybar, and Medina. While the specifics are not entirely clear, it is possible that the Qedarite Kingdom cooperated with Nabonidus in his conquest of the Kingdom of Tayma. The Neo-Babylonian Empire collapsed and Nabonidus' reign was terminated when Babylon was captured by the Achaemenid King Cyrus the Great in 539 BC.

The Kingdom of Qedar came to rule a large area in the second half of the fifth century BC including southern Palestine, the Sinai Peninsula, the southern regions of eastern Jordan, and parts of the Hejaz. Both the Bible and Herodotus record that the Qederite Geshem the Arabian feuded with the Prophet Nehemiah over whether to rebuild the walls of Jerusalem in 445 BC. Silver vessels have been uncovered near Pithom that bear the name of the Qederite King Qinu ibn Geshem, the king of Qidar, who is believed to be the son of Geshem the Arabian. 

References to the Qedarites start to be replaced in the historical record with references to the Nabataeans following Alexander the Great's conquest of Gaza in 332 BC. The Nabataean Kingdom seized control of the regional incense trade in this period. In 106 AD, the last Nabataean King Rabbel II died and the Nabataean Kingdom was conquered by the Roman Emperor Trajan and turned into Arabia Petraea.

The former Qaderite capital of Dumat al-Jandal continued to serve as a major regional urban center into the Byzantine era and was home to a major marketplace. Following Byzantine rule Al-Jawf came under the control of the Kalb tribe and then the Kingdom of Kinda.

Islamic history 
The Prophet Muhammad  invaded al-Jawf twice as part of his Arab conquests between 622 and 632. Following the second conquest led by Muslim leader Abd al-Rahman ibn Awf the region converted to Islam. 

When Abu Bakr became caliph in 632 he launched the Ridda wars against rebel Arab tribes in a number of regions, including Al-Jawf. In 633 a Rashidun Army under Khalid ibn al-Walid persecuted rebels in the region following al-Walid's victory at the Battle of Ayn al-Tamr. He successfully captured and occupied Dumat al-Jandal before retreating back to Al-Hirah.

Imru Al Qais bin Al Asbagh Al Kalbi ruled the region during the reign of the Caliph Umar between 634 and 644. Marwan bin Al Hakam ruled Al-Jawf during the reign of the Caliph Uthman in the 640s and 650s.

The Tayy tribe became dominant in the Al-Jawf region during the 10th century. The Al-Fadl family from the Tayy tribe ruled the area between the 12th and 14th centuries. The Tayy began raiding Al-Shami, a location on the Egyptian Hajj route, in the 16th century. In 1521 the Ottoman Empire agreed to pay the Tayy tribe to cease their attacks on the Hajj route. 

Al-Jawf was incorporated into the first Saudi state in 1793 during the reign of Imam Abdul Aziz bin Muhammad. The incorporation of the region was not achieved peacefully; Imam Muhammad sent an army to the Al Jawf that conquered three towns, killed many local civilians, and besieged the major population centers until they pledged allegiance to the Saudi state. During the reign of Imam Saud bin Abdulaziz Al Saud, which lasted from 1803 to 1814, the area remained under Saudi control. 

In the mid-19th century the region became part of the Emirate of Jabal Shammar, which was ruled by the Rashidi dynasty and nominally affiliated with the second Saudi state. In 1838 Abdullah bin Ali Al Rashid sent an army of 3,000 men led by his brother Ubaid to attack al-Jawf and collect zakat, but the region was not formally conquered at that time. In 1853 Talal bin Abdullah Al Rashid sent another army to Al-Jawf that conquered and incorporated the region within Jabal Shammar over the course of a two year campaign.

Modern history 
Muhsin al-Shaalan, Al-Nouri's cousin, ceded the Qurayyat, Saudi Arabia|Qurayyat]] (Qurayyat al-Salt) region, which is the last remaining part of the al-Jawf region, and he ceded it in favor of the Saudi state. Ibn Battah was appointed a follower of Abdullah al-Tamimi{when?}}, the emir of al-Jawf, The Emirate of Transjordan, however, rejected this. It saw that it was more deserving to rule the Qurayyat region, so it escalates with the Saudi state by demanding of establish a neutral zone between the two countries, the withdrawal of the Saudis from the Hijaz, and the return of the Al-Rashid family in Hail and the family of Al-Ayed in Asir to authority. This was rejected by Saudi state. As a reaction of that, Saudi forces crawled over the Jordanian villages until they reached Yadodah, a few miles away from the city of Amman, At that time, Britain intervened by bombing the Saudi forces and forcing them to withdraw and return to the dialogue. Which was the case so the Saudi state agreed with Britain, which represents East Jordan, to give the Qurayyat region to Saudi Arabia and protect Saudi trade with Syria. That agreement was known as the Hada agreement. After the annexation of the Hijaz, the Qurayyat region was known as the "Emirate of Qurayyat and the Northern Border Inspectorate." At the end of the year 1349 AH (1931 A.D.), King Abdulaziz appointed for the second time Turki bin Ahmed Al-Sudairy a prince on Al-Jouf, and he moved the capital from Dumat al-Jandal to Sakaka. One of the most important events that passed on Al-Jouf during this period is the protection of Sultan al-Atrash, the leader of the Great Syrian Revolution in Al-Jouf region from 1927 AD to 1932 AD.

In the year 1358 AH, governmental departments in the Qurayyat region moved from the village of Kaf to the village of Nabak (which later became known as the City of Qurayyat). In the year 1376 AH (1957 AD) Tabarjal was established after a part of the Shararat tribe settled in the region. Kingdom of Saudi Arabia signed an agreement with the Kingdom of Jordan which was known as the Amman Agreement in 1965 to delineate the borders in the north of the Hijaz and confirm the previous agreement. On 28 Shaaban 1412 AH (1991 AD), the zoning system was issued during the reign of King Fahd bin Abdulaziz Al Saud, and the Qurayyat region merged with the Jawf region and Tabuk region. The system also resulted in the formation of the District Council, which consists of 33 members, twenty of whom are residents of the region, and the rest are state employees.

Population 
Population growth in the Al-Jouf region is generally high, with a population of 520,737 people, according to the report of the General Authority for Statistics for the year (2018). [58] [59]

Geography

Location 
Al-Jouf region is located in the northwest of the Kingdom, and it is bordered by three Saudi administrative regions which are the Northern Border region to the north and east, the Hail region to the southeast, the Tabuk region to the southwest, and one country is the Hashemite Kingdom of Jordan to the north and northwest.

Geography of the region

Highs 
There are many lava fields, hills and mountains in the region, such as:
 Harrat al-Harrat extends from Syria in the south through Jordan to Al-Jawf, and its area within the Kingdom's lands is approximately 15,200 km2, and it is located in the northeast of Al-Jawf region.
 Harra al-Rashrasheyah is located 16 km north of Qurayyat.
 Harra al-Busaylah, is 17 km away from Kaf village.
 The Hammad Plateau, a flat-level plateau is located to the north of Hurra al-Hurra, has many channels, and is approximately 800 to 850 meters high.
 The Hajar Plateau is located to the east of the Hammad Plateau, and most of its lands are located in the northern border region.
 Jabal Touqa (Touqa mountain) is located northwest of Sakaka Governorate, and is approximately 1039 meters high.
 Jabal Naeej (Naeej mountain), is located northeast of Qurayyat, and it is approximately 1023 meters high.
 Laila Mountain is located to the northeast of Tabarjal, and its height is approximately 897 meters.
 Jabal Al-Hossan (Al-Hossan mountain), is located north of Qurayyat, is approximately 689 meters high.
 Jabal Maqil (Maqil mountain), one kilometer away from the village of Kaf, where many tools from the Copper age and Stone Age were found.
 Prince's Mountain, a two-peaks mountain in Sakaka, on the first summit is the Castle of Zaabal, and an ancient tomb is on the second summit.
 Jabal Al-Saidi (Al-Saidi mountain) is located near the village of Kaf, and on the top, there is a fortress believed to belong to the Nabataean period of the area.
 Qayyal Mountain, 12 km northeast of Sakaka, was found on the site of a Nabataean garrison.
 Qarat al-Nisah, located 5 km west of Mossen, has found many inscriptions and foundations.
 Qarat Al-Mazzad, is located 6 km north of the Alqait suburb, that is located northeast of Sakaka, and numerous inscriptions have been found there.

Desert 
The Great Nafud desert is located in the Al-Jouf region, which was previously known as Sand Alaj. It extends from Al-Jouf in its west to Hail in the east, and its area is approximately 64,630 km2.

Lows 
There are many short and large valleys in the region, but the most famous one is the Sirhan Valley. It is the most important valley of Al-Jouf, its length is 180 km, and it has an importance in agriculture in the region. There are several other important valleys such as Wadi Fajr and its length is 135 km. It flows into the Valley of Sirhan, [Wadi Al-Ayli is the largest of Harra Al-Harra and one of Siran valleys. There are also other valleys, such as: Wadi Al-Shuhatiyah, Wadi Al-Merir, Wadi Hasida, Wadi Baar, Wadi Al-Safa, Wadi Hadraj, Wadi Al-Moi, and Wadi Al-Bayer.

Other than the valleys, there are Khabara (Swamps). The most famous one is Khabara Al-Amhas, which is a land where rainwater collects, some plants grow in, and is located in the desert of Hammad. There also are many Sabkhas. The most popular is Sabkah Hadhodha, which is located near Al-Issawiya and covers an area of 540 km2, thus making it the largest Sabkhas of the kingdom's.

Al-Jouf is also famous for Dumat al-Jandal Lake, and it is 585 meters above sea level, with an area of one million and one hundred thousand square meters.

Climate 
Al-Jawf region falls within the semi-tropical high pressure belt, which makes wind an influence in the region. In the winter, the arid northeast winds blow, making Al Jouf's weather stable and cool in this season. The astronomical location of the region may cause the development of air fronts as a result of the collision of the arid northeast winds with the humid southwest winds, causing Precipitation. The maritime impact on the region is limited because the geographical location of the Jawf is far from the Red Sea, the Arabian Sea, the Arabian Gulf, and the winds through which it does not help in the rains. The Mediterranean is the sea that most affects the region.

The region is one of the coldest regions in Saudi Arabia during winter. Temperature reaches only 15 Celsius during the day in January, it drops to two degrees in the evening, and it may reach below zero. In summer, temperatures reach 40 degrees Celsius in late July, and at night it drops to 19 degrees in the north of the region and 23 in the south. High and low temperatures adversely affect the region in water loss, plant wilt or frost formation and damage to agricultural crops.

Rain falls in the region mostly between October and May in the fall and winter seasons, and it decreases during the rest of the year. The average annual rainfall is about 80 mm. The rains are fluctuating, falling one year significantly, but little in another year. In general, however, when it is raining accompanied by the formation of hail, strong wind, thunderstorms, and torrential torrents. This fluctuation and changing factors are detrimental to the region and its agricultural economy.

Administrative Divisions 
The region is divided into the emirate's headquarters located in Sakaka Governorate, two (type A) governorates, the Qurayyat Governorate, and the Duma al-Jandal, and one (B) Governorate, Tabarjal. These governorates are divided into centers affiliated with them. The number of centers in the Al-Jouf region is 33 centers distributed among the four governorates. These centers are:

List of governors 
Since annexation of the region to rule the third Saudi state, several princes have ruled it, including Turki bin Ahmed Al Sudairi, who ruled for two different periods, and they are:

The princes of the Qurayyat region 
Nine princes have followed over the Qurayyat region from the time Muhsin al-Sha’lan abdicated it until her annexation to the Al-Jawf region, and they are: [47] [89]

Public services

Transportation 
The region is connected with the capital Riyadh by a 1309 km long road that passes from the city of Sakaka and reaches the city of Arar. It is also linked to the city of Jeddah (on the Red Sea coast) through the city of Dumat al-Jandal and the city of Madinah by a road with a length of 1258 km. Furthermore, the provincial centers in the region are connected to each other. There are two airports in the region: The first is in the city of Sakaka is known as the Al-Jouf Domestic Airport(AJF / OESK), and the other airport is in Qurayyat and is known as the Gurayat Domestic Airport (URY / OEGT). It is planned that the region will also be linked with the rest of the Kingdom by a network of railways within the North-South Train (SAR), which links the capital Riyadh with the cities of Sakakah, Qurayyat, Haditha and the Basita farms.

The distance between the emirate's headquarters in Sakaka city and the different cities of the Kingdom in kilometers (km):

Education 
Like other regions of the Kingdom, education was limited at the beginning to the Kuttab in mosques where the Qur'an and the Arabic language are taught, and wood planks and tamarix sticks are used for writing. In the year 1362 AH, the first regular school in the area, the Emiri School in Sakaka, was opened, and it includes one class and one teacher. In 1364 AH, the Omar bin al-Khattab School was opened in the city of Dumat al-Jandal, and then opening formal schools has continued.

In the year 1369 AH, the Al-Jouf region with the Qurayyat and Tabuk regions submitted a request to King Abdulaziz to grant a financial reward to each student, and the king agreed. Later, with the increase in the number of schools, the task of supervising them was assigned to the education of the Madinah region, then to the education of Dammam. In the year 1377 AH, the Central Inspection Office was established to link between Al-Jouf and Dammam. In the year 1388 AH, the Central Inspection Office turned into a special "education office" in the region, then to an "Educational Supervision Bureau" and finally in the year 1398 AH to an "Education Administration."

The first school for girls was opened in the region in the year 1382 AH. and in the year 1401AH, the College of Education for Girls arose. In the next year, the Health Institute for Nursing was established, and the "Girls 'Education Commission" became an independent department in the name of "the Department of Girls' Education in Al-Jouf". The following year the Boys' Health Institute was established, and in 1423 AH, the College of Science for Boys was established. In the year 1426 AH, Al-Jouf University was opened.

Healthcare 
The central hospital in Sakaka (Abdel Rahman Al-Sudairy Hospital) was built in the year 1385 AH (1965 AD) to be the first hospital in the region, and this hospital was specialized in chest diseases due to the spread of tuberculosis in the region. With the increasing population need for hospitals, King Faisal Hospital in Qurayyat, the Diagnostic and Obstetric Center in Dumat al-Jandal, and the Ambulance and Obstetrics Center in Tabarja were established in the year 1395 AH. In 1404 AH, the Mental Health Hospital was established, The General Hospital was opened in Qurayyat in 1405 AH. On the first of Rajab 1406 AH, the Health Affairs Department was established Al-Jouf after it was affiliated with the Health Affairs Directorate of the Northern Health in the city of Arar, In 1425 AH Seven hospitals and 29 health centers were affiliated with the Health Affairs Department. In the following year, the Sawyer General Hospital was established, and in 1433 AH, the Abu Ajram General Hospital was established.

Economy and natural resources

Agriculture 
Formerly, agriculture is considered the basic profession of the region's residents. Backpackers have described agricultural crops in Al-Jouf as they pass through it. Among those who referred to the agricultural crops is the Finnish backpacker George August Wallin (Yrjö Aukusti Wallin) who mentioned that palm trees, figs, apricots, oranges and grapes are planted in the region. This is what also was indicated by the William Palgrave adding that dates are the only crop that It is sold outside the region. In the modern era, Abdul Rahman bin Ahmed Al-Sudairy, the governor of Al-Jawf region, mentioned that olives, apples, pears, pomegranates, wheat and barley are grown in the region. The Guinness Book records that the largest modern olive farm in the world is also found in Al-Jouf.

Agricultural machines were brought to the region in the year 1368 AH. Branch of the Ministry of Agriculture was established in the year 1379 AH. Then the emirate distributed agricultural lands to citizens. The number of distributed farms reaching 7,500. The region is now famous for cultivating an olive tree, and it produces 67% of olive oil in the Kingdom of Saudi Arabia. Olive trees began to be planted in 1392 AH. In 1437 AH (2016 AD), the number of olive trees reached 18 million trees producing between 30 and 40 thousand tons of olives and 10 thousand tons of olive oil. The number of olive presses reached 23 presses.

In addition to olives, there are 10 million fruit trees in Al-Jouf annually producing 170 thousand tons. Also, there are 1.2 million palm trees annually producing 40 thousand tons of dates, the most famous of which is Hilwah Al-Jouf. The number of Al-Jouf farms is 12 thousand farms and 3 thousand agricultural projects that contain 30 million trees that produces olives, palms, fruits, vegetables, and fodder.

Among the most important problems facing agriculture is the problem of depleting groundwater with the increasing number of agricultural projects, especially in the Basita Farms Project and the cultivated areas, where the cultivated area reached 428 thousand hectares.

Livestock 
In 1402 AH, corresponding to 1982 AD (the former name of the ministry at the time), the Ministry of Agriculture and Water started the project of the rangeland development center and improved it to preserve livestock in the Al-Jawf region in cooperation with FAO. The center included several departments working on rangeland management, soil conservation, production management and animal health. The National Wildlife Protection and Development Authority has established several reserves to protect the region's animals and planets.

According to the statistics of 1426 AH corresponding to 2005 AD, Al-Jouf Region included 1,569,733 heads of sheep, 1,740 heads of cows, 7,398 heads of camels, 88,845 heads of goats, and 2,791,227 poultry. The region included 6 projects for raising chickens, 4 projects to produce eggs, and 3 projects specialized in breeding and fattening lamb.

Industry 
Before the establishment of the Saudi state, the industry in the region was handcrafted products, such as: leather industry, such as horse belts, arms sheaths and water closures, weaving industries such as cages, utensils, baskets and fans, wooden industries such as doors and some agricultural tools, stone industries such as the millstone, the grind and the mortar, and woolen industries such as sleeping mats, carpets and the abaya. The industry before the year 1390 AH (1970 AD) was very limited, but it was increasing. Several industrial workshops were opened which numbered in the year 1418 AH nearly 200 workshops, and the number of factories reached 20 factories in the year that followed and their investments amounted to 112 million riyals at the time. Investment rose up to 220 million riyals in the year 1425 AH (2004 AD). 12 factories specialized in the food and beverage industry, then 4 factories for the chemical and plastic industries, and 4 factories for the building materials, ceramics and glass industries.

The industrial contribution in the region is limited, so that the number of factories in the region represents only 0.53% of the factories in the Kingdom of Saudi Arabia. The number of their workers represents only 0.23% of the number of workers in other factories, and the invested capital represents only 0.08% of the invested capital in the rest of the factories. Industrial projects in the region are mostly individual projects with limited funding. all of them are national in the absence of foreign investment. Most industrial activity is limited to the food and beverage industry, depending on wealth and potential in the region.

Minerals 
The Ministry of Petroleum and Mineral Resources (now called the Ministry of Energy, Industry and Mineral Resources) has conducted exploratory and prospecting studies for the region. Consequently, the presence of many raw materials was determined, such as: clay in the areas of Jal Ajrabeh and Al Dhailiya, which is used in the manufacture of building materials. Silica sand is found in the areas of Al-Malih and Al-Luja and on the extension of the Tabuk road, southeast Sakaka. Silica is used in the manufacture of glass, and it exists in its forms of quartz, opal, and chalcedony. In the region, there are also basalt rocks found in Hurra Al Hurra, and enter in the manufacture of Pozzolan cement. The region also contains limestone rocks found in Wadi Al Hablah and western Jabal Al Abd, dolomite rocks along the Sakaka Arar road, the mineral phosphate found in Hurra Al Hurra, and salt found in Wadi Al-Sarhan, Hadhodhaa, Kaf, and Etherh.

Trade 
In the past, trade in the region depended on the system of bartering and the exchange of goods according to the needs of the individual. The region suffered in the year 1356 AH (1937 AD) and until the year 1365 AH (1945 AD) for two reasons, namely the lack of imports due to the weak financial resources of the population, and the Second World War that caused an economic crisis to a number of countries in the world.

With the development of the state and the emergence of chambers of commerce, increasing records and licenses, securing basic life necessities and developing income sources among the population as a result of development, the number of markets, commercial complexes, individual institutions and companies has increased, which numbered 6191 institutions and companies in the Al-Jouf region. Among the most important commercial activities in the region in the commercial sector are wholesale and retail trade in foodstuffs, electrical and sanitary ware, fabrics and clothing.

Because of its geographical location in the northwest of the Kingdom of Saudi Arabia, A large portion of land trade passes through a Al-Hadithah port, one of the most important commercial outlets for the Kingdom, and it is one of the largest and most important outlets in the Middle East region linking the Gulf Cooperation Council states with Jordan, the countries of the Levant, Egypt and Turkey, the destination to the countries European. The region has a branch of the Ministry of Trade and Investment that issues licenses to companies and institutions, combats commercial fraud, conforms to specifications, and monitors markets to protect consumers.

Wildlife

Vegetable cover 
The vegetation is weak in many locations. The most important plants that form the cover are: Lavender, Ziziphus, Opophytum, Truffles, Malva, Plantago ovata, Maha, Erodium, Artemisia, Achillea, Pulicaria, Asafoetida, chrysanthemum, Haloxylon, Haloxylon persicum, Calligonum, Tamarix, Rhanterium epapposum, Neurada procumbens, Atriplex, Salsola, Anisosciadium, Lepidium, Diplotaxis, Papaver dubium, Erucaria, Hippocrepis unisiliquosa, Sonchus, Anchusa, Tragopogon, Scorzonera, Allium sindjarense, Leek, Chamomile, Clover, Thyme, Anemone, Stipagrostis, Retama, Lycium shawii and Aloysia.

Animal life

Mammals 
Desert and mountain environment in Al – Jouf contributed to the existence of many mammals. In the region, there are five species of the order of even – numbered Hoof namely the Arabian oryx , and Goitered gazelle, Ghazal junction , Dorcas gazelle , and Nubian ibex. These species are deemed one of the rarest species in the region due to excessive hunting that they were exposed to in the twentieth century which led to their disappearance from all or most of their natural habitats.  There are also seven species of the order of Carnivores, Arabian wolf , Rüppell's fox , Red fox, Honey badger , Striped hyena , Sand cat, and a wild cat. Numbers of these species are constantly decreasing because they are considered a threat to livestock and Badia residents. Finally, in the area, there are ten species belonging to four order of insectivora, desert hedgehog from erinaceidae order, Cape hare from lagomorpha order, Rock hyrax from Aleupreat order, and finally Rodents order, which 7 types belong to it, they are Cheesman's gerbil, Wagner's gerbil, Libyan rat, Sundoval rat, Lesser Egyptian jerboa, Euphrates jerboa, and Porcupine.

Birds 
The first person who wrote about the birds of the region was John Philby in the year 1923. The most important thing, he mentioned was that the Arabian ostrich, which was raised in Dumat al-Jandal and was found naturally in Wadi Al-Sarhan. Studies in the area have continued to register birds, there was Richard Minershagen's study in 1954, Arthur Green's study in 1983, a study by the National Wildlife Service, then a study by British bird scientist Michael Jennings in 1995. The Harra Al Hurra and Dumat Al Jandal Lake are the two most important regions in Al Jawf for birds; first provides protection for birds due to the difficulty in accessing and hunting people, and the second is a wet area where birds visit. During the surveys in the nineties of the twentieth century, more than 10 thousand birds were registered in Winter. Birds in Al-Jouf suffer from overfishing, the disappearance of natural areas, and their vulnerability to unregulated human consumption of groundwater. Although many birds live in the region, and it is considered a transit area for birds in their migration, yet only 170 migratory species have been registered there.

Reptiles 
In Al-Jawf region, there is one of the four orders of reptiles, which is the order of the Squamata. There specifically is the existence of Twenty-two species of Lizards, and nine types of Snakes. Most of these species are found in good numbers in their natural habitats, but the Uromastyx aegyptia may face the risk of extinction due to the overfishing that it is exposed to. In addition to that, Elegant racer, Egyptian catsnake, and Desert black snakes are found in small numbers in their original habitat. For Jan's Cliff Racer, its numbers are medium in its places of spread

Arthropods 
The Kingdom’s environment is rich in many types of Arthropods, and many of them live in the Al-Jawf region. These types are classified in several classes such as arachnid and have several s such as Spiders, Solifugaes, Scorpions, and Acari. There are also other classes such as Centipede. There is in Al-Jouf only one type is Scolopendra (known locally as the mother of the forty-four). Also, there is insects class, and many belong t o it such as cockroaches, Orthoptera, Homoptera, Hemiptera, Beetles, Lepidoptera, Hymenoptera, and Diptera order. These insects may be harmful to agricultural crops, disturbing people and most likely being gotten rid of.

Culture and tourism

Archaeologies 
The region has many archaeological sites that date back to the stone and copper ages, and extend through the era of Qedar, the Nabataeans and Roman influence, to reach the first era Islam. Then, it is followed by the ages of the Umayyad and Abbasid states, the Ottoman era and the rule of the Shaalan family, then the Saudi state. In these sites, there were discovered settlements, tombs, pottery, Thamudic, Nabatean, and Roman inscriptions, as well as Arabic inscriptions from various Islamic periods.

museums 
Al-Jouf region contains one general museum, Al-Jouf Museum, located in Dumat al-Jandal Governorate near the archaeological area and its current area is 3600 m2. The governorate also includes many private museums such as Al-Nuwaiser Heritage Museum, which consists of two halls and many rooms that include a popular market having numerous ancient coins, local industries, and farming tools. Furthermore, Wethiman Museum, which displays local industries, war tools, and wool products. In other cities, there are museums such as the Tree Museum for Heritage located in Qurayyat. A large tree mediates it, and a heritage tent and a building divided into three parts surround the tree and display old publications, mummies and local artifacts. In Sakaka, on the other hand there is the Nasser Qadir Al Arouj Heritage Museum, which displays many artifacts, coffee and hospitality tools, a range of war tools and weapons, some leather goods, and farming and house tools.

Festivals 
Al-Jawf has many festivals that most of them are related to the region's special crops. Among the most famous festivals held in Al-Jouf are the Olive Festival, which number of visitors reached to about 95 thousand. Also, Al-Jouf Dates Festival includes 85 exhibition of dates in the region, and it contains 90 luxurious varieties of dates. In addition to the fruit festival, there are traditional festivals that are held in the region such as Al Sadu Festival that contributes to maintaining and spreading the craft of Al Sadu industry in the region and supporting productive families. Moreover, Mogidh Tabarajal Festival for Camels supports camel racing sport. Finally, Tabarjal's Festival for the Revival of Heritage has nearly 20,000 visitors annually. Many summer festivals are held in Al-Jouf, just like other regions in Saudi Arabia

Traditional Cuisine 
The region abounds with many special foods. Because of its proximity to Hail, they shares many foods. One of the region's special foods is the "bakkila",and it is made by mixing the dates of Al-Jawf, known as Al-Helwa, with the al-Samh plant after roasting its grains, known as al-Sabeeb, with natural ghee. In addition to many other regular Saudi food such as Kabsah.

Sport Clubs 
Six Soccer Clubs was established in Al-Jouf, they are:

See also 
 Winston's Hiccup

References

Further reading 
 The Ancient Arabs: Nomads on the Borders of the Fertile Crescent, 9Th-5Th Centuries B.C. Israel Ephʻal. BRILL, 1982. ISBN 9652234001.
 The inscriptions of Tiglath-pileser III, King of Assyria. Critical edition, with introductions, translations and commentary. Hayim Tadmor. The Israel Academy of Sciences and Humanities, 1994. ISBN 9652081116.
 The Arabs in Antiquity: Their History from the Assyrians to the Umayyads. Jan Retso. Routledge, 2013. ISBN 1136872825.
 Continental Commentary Series. Second volume (13–27). Hans Wildberger. Fortress Press, 1997. ISBN 0800695097.
 Ancient Records of Assyria and Babylonia. Second volume. Daniel David Luckenbill. University of Chicago Press, 1927.
 The Oxford Handbook of the Archaeology of the Levant: c. 8000–332 BCE. Margreet L. Steiner, Ann E. Killebrew. OUP Oxford, 2014. ISBN 0191662550.
 Men on the Rocks: The Formation of Nabataean Petra. Michel Mouton, Stephan G. Schmid. Logos Verlag Berlin GmbH, 2013. ISBN 3832533133.
 Dumbrell, William J.. 1971. "The Tell El-maskhuta Bowls and the 'kingdom' of Qedar in the Persian Period". Bulletin of the American Schools of Oriental Research, no. 203. American Schools of Oriental Research: 33–44. DOI:10.2307/1356289.
 Al-Otaibi, Fahad Mutlaq . (2015). The Annexation of the Nabataean Kingdom in 106 A.D: New Epigraphic and Archaeological Consideration. Mediterranean Archaeology and Archaeometry, Vol. 16, No 1,(2016),pp. 151–156. DOI:10.5281/zenodo.27743

External links
 A travel through the province of Al Jouf, Splendid Arabia: A travel site with photos and routes

 
Provinces of Saudi Arabia